The Midnight Guest is a 1923 American crime film directed by George Archainbaud and written by Rupert Julian. The film stars Grace Darmond, Mahlon Hamilton, Clyde Fillmore, Pat Harmon and Mathilde Brundage. The film was released on March 17, 1923, by Universal Pictures.

Cast          
Grace Darmond as Gabrielle
Mahlon Hamilton as John Dryden
Clyde Fillmore as William Chatfield
Pat Harmon as Monk
Mathilde Brundage as Aunt Sally

References

External links
 

1923 films
American crime films
1923 crime films
Universal Pictures films
Films directed by George Archainbaud
American silent feature films
American black-and-white films
1920s English-language films
1920s American films